Angiola is a genus of sea snails, marine gastropod mollusks in the family Planaxidae.

This genus has become a synonym of Hinea Gray, 1847.

Species
Species within the genus Angiola include:
 Angiola fasciata (Pease, 1868): synonym of Hinea fasciata (Pease, 1868)
 Angiola labiosa (A. Adams, 1853): synonym of Hinea zonata (A. Adams, 1853)
 Angiola lineata (Da Costa, 1778): synonym of Hinea lineata (da Costa, 1778)
 Angiola longispira (E.A. Smith, 1872): synonym of Hinea longispira (E. A. Smith, 1872)
 Angiola periscelida Dall, 1926: : synonym of Hinea longispira (E. A. Smith, 1872)
 Angiola punctostriata (Smith E.A., 1872): synonym of Hinea punctostriata (E. A. Smith, 1872)
 Angiola zonata (A. Adams, 1853): synonym of Hinea zonata (A. Adams, 1853)

References

 Rolán E., 2005. Malacological Fauna From The Cape Verde Archipelago. Part 1, Polyplacophora and Gastropoda.

External links
 Dall, W. H. (1926). New shells from Japan and the Loochoo Islands. Proceedings of the Biological Society of Washington. 39: 63-66
 Ponder W.F. (1988). Bioluminescence in Hinea braziliana (Lamarck) (Gastropoda : Planaxidae). Journal of Molluscan Studies. 54(3): 361

Planaxidae